Thomas Sykes, DD (died 1705) was an English academic. He was born in Bagworth and educated at Trinity College, Oxford. He was Lady Margaret Professor of Divinity at Oxford from 1691 and President of Trinity from 1704, holding both posts until his death on 14 December 1705.

References

1705 deaths
People from Leicestershire
17th-century English theologians
18th-century English theologians
Alumni of Trinity College, Oxford
Presidents of Trinity College, Oxford
Lady Margaret Professors of Divinity